The fifth season of the Sgt. Frog anime series consists of the fifty-one episodes after episode two-hundred-and-five from the series, which first aired in Japan from April 5, 2008 to March 28, 2009 on TV Tokyo. Season 5 uses 5 songs: 2 Openings and 3 Endings.  by Keroro Platoon is used as the opening from episode 206 to 231.  by JAM Project is used as the opening from episode 232 to 256.  by the Keroro Platoon is used as the ending from episode 206 to 218.  by Natsumi Kiyoura is used as the ending from episode 219 to 244.  by the Keroro Platoon is used as the ending from episode 245 to 256.


Episode list

References

External links
  season episodes
  Keroro Gunsō schedule - Sunrise

2008 Japanese television seasons
2009 Japanese television seasons
Season 5